The SS Clan Forbes was a British cargo steamship. She was built for Clan Line Steamers Ltd as one of its s. She was launched at Greenock in 1938, served in the Second World War and was scrapped in Hong Kong 1959.

This was the third of four Clan Line ships called Clan Forbes. The first was a steamship built in 1882 and sold to Furness, Withy & Co in 1903. The second was a steamship built in 1903 and sunk by a u-boat in 1918. The fourth was a motor ship built in 1961, sold in 1968 and scrapped in 1985.

Building
Clan Forbes was launched on 8 September 1938 and completed that December.

Clan Forbes had 20 corrugated furnaces with a combined grate area of  heating five single-ended forced draught boilers with a combined heating surface of  that supplied superheated steam at 220 lbf/in2 to a pair of three-cylinder triple-expansion steam engines. Steam exhausted from the low-pressure cylinders then drove a pair of Bauer-Wach low-pressure steam turbines with double reduction gearing and Föttinger hydraulic couplings to twin propeller shafts. J G Kincaid and Company of Greenock built the four engines, whose combined power was rated at 1,370 NHP.

War service
On 16 August 1940 Clan Forbes was damaged by bombs in a Luftwaffe air raid whilst berthed at Port of Tilbury. In November 2013 she was one of the three merchant ships that took part in Operation Collar, a convoy to supply Malta and Alexandria. An attempt by Italian forces to intercept the ships resulted in the Battle of Cape Spartivento, after which Clan Forbes and her sister  continued to Malta. She spent some of her time disguised as the submarine depot ship , having been fitted with a dummy funnel.

Post-war
Surviving the war, she continued in Clan Line service until 1959. She was then sold for scrap, and arrived at Hong Kong on 6 August 1959 to be broken up.

References

1938 ships
Cameron-class steamships
Ships of the Clan Line
Steamships of the United Kingdom
World War II merchant ships of the United Kingdom